Moss-side or Mosside (from  Scots moss side, meaning "peat-bog district" or "district beside the peat bog") is a small village and townland in County Antrim, Northern Ireland. In the 2001 Census it had a population of 270 people.

It is situated in the Causeway Coast and Glens Borough Council area.

Features 
The village includes a number of commercial businesses, as well as recreational and community facilities.

References 

NI Neighbourhood Information System

See also  
List of villages in Northern Ireland
Moss Side, an area of Manchester in England.

Villages in County Antrim
Townlands of County Antrim